Ludlow is a village in Champaign County, Illinois, United States. The population was 308 at the 2020 census.

History
Ludlow was originally known as Pera or Pera Station. The village was renamed Ludlow in 1867 after Thomas W. Ludlow, a shareholder in the Illinois Central Railroad.

Geography
Ludlow is located at  (40.386248, -88.126856).

Demographics

As of the 2020 census there were 308 people, 173 households, and 80 families residing in the village. The racial makeup of the village was 75.32% White, 2.60% African American, 1.30% Asian, 0.00% Pacific Islander, 10.71% from other races, and 10.06% from two or more races. Hispanic or Latino of any race were 14.29% of the population.

There were 173 households, out of which 36.99% had children under the age of 18 living with them, 27.17% were married couples living together, 2.89% had a female householder with no husband present, and 53.76% were non-families. 36.99% of all households were made up of individuals, and 13.29% had someone living alone who was 65 years of age or older. The average household size was 3.31 and the average family size was 2.46.

The village's age distribution consisted of 18.1% under the age of 18, 17.8% from 18 to 24, 24.7% from 25 to 44, 30.6% from 45 to 64, and 8.9% who were 65 years of age or older. The median age was 37.7 years. For every 100 females, there were 94.5 males. For every 100 females age 18 and over, there were 110.2 males.

The median income for a household in the village was $47,679, and the median income for a family was $60,625. Males had a median income of $45,417 versus $20,000 for females. The per capita income for the village was $20,027. About 15.0% of families and 26.4% of the population were below the poverty line, including 37.5% of those under age 18 and none of those age 65 or over.

Cultural references 
The town of Ludlow is identified as the first site of an invasion of giant locusts in the 1957 movie Beginning of the End.

References

Villages in Champaign County, Illinois
Villages in Illinois
Populated places established in 1867
1867 establishments in Illinois